Lexical semantics
Semantic relations
Types of words